The Era is the tenth studio album by Taiwanese singer Jay Chou, released on 18 May 2010 by JVR Music and Virgin Records Taiwan.

The album was nominated for six Golden Melody Awards and won for Best Mandarin Male Singer, Best Mandarin album, and Best Musical Arrangement for "Free Tutorial Video".

The tracks, "Superman Can't Fly", "Rain Falls All Night", and "The Era", are listed at number 2, number 10, and number 39 respectively on the 2010s Hit FM Top 100 Singles of the Year chart.

Track listing

Awards

References

External links
  Jay Chou discography@JVR Music

2010 albums
Jay Chou albums
Sony Music Taiwan albums